The 1974 Madison Dukes football team was an American football team that represented Madison College (now known as James Madison University) during the 1974 NCAA Division II football season as a member of the Virginia College Athletic Association (VCAA). Led by third-year head coach Challace McMillin, the Dukes compiled a record of 6–4, with a mark of 3–2 in conference play, and finished fifth in the VCAA.

Schedule

References 

Madison
James Madison Dukes football seasons
Madison Dukes football